Petrophile shirleyae is a species of flowering plant in the family Proteaceae and is endemic to Queensland. It is a shrub with pinnate, needle-shaped, sharply-pointed leaves, and narrow oval heads of silky-hairy white to pale cream-coloured flowers.

Description

Taxonomy
Petrophile shirleyae was first formally described in 1891 by Frederick Manson Bailey in the Botany Bulletin of the Department of Agriculture, Queensland from material collected by John Francis Shirley on Moreton Island. The specific epithet (shirleyae) honours the wife of the collector of the type material.

Distribution and habitat
Petrophile shirleyae grows in sandy heath and forest in near-coastal areas of south-eastern Queensland.

Conservation status
This petrophile is classified as of "least concern" under the Queensland Government Nature Conservation Act 1992.

References

Flora of Queensland
shirleyae
Plants described in 1891
Taxa named by Frederick Manson Bailey